Qurtuba University (QU) was established in 2001. Qurtuba is Arabic variation of name of Córdoba, Spain, in Al-Andalus nowadays Spain.It has two campuses in Dera Ismail Khan and Peshawar Pakistan from Both are separately recognized and are placed in highest 'W3' category by the HEC. It has seventh position among universities of Pakistan by the rankings of Higher Education Commission of Pakistan. It is chartered by the Government of Khyber Pakhtunkhwa and approved by the Higher Education Commission of Pakistan.

Qurtuba University of Science and Information Technology is one of the pioneer private sector universities of Khyber PakhtunKhwa Pakistan.

History
The university was established through a charter issued by the Governor (K.P.K) on 30 August 2001 and is recognized by the Higher Education commission (former UGC), Islamabad. In 2006, the Girls School & College was separated. In 2008, a model school in P.I.A society Lahore was established.

Achievements
Qurtuba University of Science & IT has been awarded ‘W3’ Category by the Higher Education Commission of Pakistan in the new ranking system and has placed among the top ranked universities of the country. Qurtuba University is the only university of Khyber Pakhtunkhwa having highest position of ranking by Higher Education Commission of Pakistan. It has been consistently placed in third position in the field of Computer Science & Information Technology in HEC rankings.

Campuses
Qurtuba University of Science and Information Technology has two campuses. Both are in Khyber Pakhtunkhwa. The main campus is in Dera Ismail Khan and the other is in Peshawar.

Programs offered 
Qurtuba University offers following graduate, post graduate and doctorate programs.

Bachelor's programs

Bachelor of Business Administration (BBA)
Bachelor of Commerce (B.Com)
Bachelor of Education (B.Ed)
Bachelor of Computer Science
Bachelor of Science in Electrical Engineering
Bachelor of Science in Civil Engineering
Bachelor of Technology in Electrical Technology
Bachelor of Technology in Civil Technology
Bachelor of Economics

Master programs
Master of Business Administration MBA
Master of Accounting (M.Com)
Master of Education (M.Ed)
Master of Science in Mathematics
Master of Science Computer Sciences
Master of Arts in English
Master of Arts inInternational Relations
Master of Science in Physics
Master of Science in Chemistry
Master of Arts in Political Science

MS programs
MS Computer Science
MS Management Sciences
MS English

M.Phil programs
M.Phil Education
M.Phil Economics
M.Phil International Relations
M.Phil Political Sciences
M.Phil Pakistan Studies
M.Phil Urdu

Ph.D programs
Ph.D Management Sciences
Ph.D International Relations
Ph.D Political Science
Ph.D Education
Ph.D Urdu

Diplomas
Diploma in Human Rights
Diploma in Islamic Banking
Diploma in Marketing
Diploma in Human Resource Management (HRM)
Diploma in Physical Education

Certificate
Certificate in Accounting

References

External links
Official site

Dera Ismail Khan District
2001 establishments in Pakistan
Educational institutions established in 2001
Private universities and colleges in Khyber Pakhtunkhwa
Peshawar District
Universities and colleges in Peshawar